The 2016 Eurocup Formula Renault 2.0 was a multi-event motor racing championship for open wheel, formula racing cars held across Europe. The championship features drivers competing in 2 litre Formula Renault single seat race cars that conform to the technical regulations for the championship.

The 2016 season was the 26th and final season Eurocup Formula Renault 2.0 season organized by the Renault Sport and the first season as the main category of the World Series by Renault. The season began at Ciudad del Motor de Aragón on 16 April and finished on 23 October at Autódromo do Estoril. The series formed part of the World Series by Renault meetings at six events.

Teams and drivers

Race calendar and results
The provisional calendar for the 2016 season was announced on 5 September 2015, The championship will take the Formula Renault 3.5 Series spot in the Monaco Grand Prix schedule. Rounds at Spielberg, Le Castellet and Estoril will return in the series' calendar. These rounds (as well as Spa) will be collaboration with European Le Mans Series. On 9 October 2015, was announced that Monza round will be included in the schedule. The round was supported by Clio Cup Italia.

Championship standings
Points system
Points were awarded to the top 10 classified finishers.

Drivers' Championship

Teams' Championship

References

External links
 Renault-Sport official website

Eurocup Formula Renault 2.0
Eurocup Formula Renault 2.0
Eurocup
Renault Eurocup